Volodymyr Tsybulko is a Ukrainian poet and politician.

Volodymyr was born on May 27, 1964 in Khmelna village of Cherkasy Oblast, in the Ukrainian SSR of the Soviet Union (in present-day Ukraine). He graduated from the Kyiv University and the Latvian State University majoring in philology.

Tsybulko is an author of a dozen books of poetry in Ukrainian, as well as in Belarusian and English languages: "Key" (1988), "Tail of a lizard" (1991), "Pyramid" (1992), "Angels and texts" (1996), "Angel of resistance" (1997, in Belarusian), "Majn Kajf" (2000), "Angels in a Pyramid" (2002, in Ukrainian and English), "Selected, pulled, winning,  washed..." (2003), "A book of warnings" (2003), etc.

For a long time, Tsybulko was an advisor to Viktor Yuschenko. He was elected to the Ukrainian parliament of 4th convocation by the party list of Viktor Yushchenko Bloc Our Ukraine, where he joined a faction of Ukrainian People's Movement.

His wife, Uliana is a singer. They have two sons, Ivan (2001) and Denis (2002).

References

External links
Volodymyr Tsybulko’s Personal Website
Volodymyr Tsybulko: Bibliography

Ukrainian poets
1964 births
Living people
People from Cherkasy Oblast
Ukrainian People's Party politicians
Fourth convocation members of the Verkhovna Rada